K-211 Petropavlovsk-Kamchatskiy is a Project 667BDR Kalmar class (NATO reporting name: Delta III) Russian nuclear ballistic missile submarine.  The submarine was built by Sevmash, Severodvinsk in the late 1970s and joined the Soviet fleet in 1980. The submarine continued to serve in the Russian Navy as part of the Pacific Fleet after the collapse of the Soviet Union. She was decommissioned in 2010 and is currently laid up, awaiting disposal. Her role and those of the other boats of her class is being taken by the new s. 

On 28 July 2017 the name Petropavlovsk-Kamchatskiy was assigned to the  B-274, under construction as of 2019. From 2017 to 2018 Rosatom undertook the removal of nuclear waste and components, with removal of the reactors complete by December 2018. As of 2019 K-211 is laid up at the Zvezda shipyard at Bolshoy Kamen awaiting disposal.

Service

Collision with a British submarine
On 23 May 1981 she collided with the British submarine .

References

 

Delta-class submarines
Ships built in the Soviet Union
1979 ships
Cold War submarines of the Soviet Union
Ships built by Sevmash